The 22nd Golden Raspberry Awards were held on March 23, 2002 at the Abracadabra Theater at Magicopolis in Santa Monica, California, to recognize the worst the movie industry had to offer in 2001. In a break with Razzie tradition, Tom Green accepted his five awards in person for Freddy Got Fingered, entertaining attendees via supplying his own red carpet and playing a never-ending harmonica piece.

Awards and nominations

Films with multiple nominations 
These films received multiple nominations:

See also

2001 in film
74th Academy Awards
55th British Academy Film Awards
59th Golden Globe Awards
8th Screen Actors Guild Awards

References

Golden Raspberry Awards
Golden Raspberry Awards ceremonies
2002 in American cinema
2002 in California
March 2002 events in the United States
Golden Raspberry